Khwaja Saeed Hai (5 March 1930 – 31 March 2021) was a Pakistani No. 1 tennis player, and the first Pakistani tennis player to reach the main draw of a Grand Slam through qualifying matches. He featured in the main draw of the Wimbledon Championships in 1955 and 1956, and reached the second round of French Open. He also played in the U.S. Open in 1964, and played in the Davis Cup for Pakistan.

He studied at the Aligarh Muslim University, where he honed his skills. AT Wimbledon he played men's singles, men's doubles and mixed doubles.

Apart from playing in the Davis Cup, he captained Pakistan's Davis Cup team 32 times with results that have not been achieved by any other captain from the country.

When the French Tennis Federation celebrated 100 years of French Championship at Roland Garros stadium, they built a commemorative wall displaying the names of players who had done well during the championship which included the name of Saeed Hai.

Saeed Hai was also the founder President of the International club whose head office is in England. Membership is only open for Grand Slam and Davis Cup players.

The International Tennis Federation (ITF) awarded him a gold medal at their annual general meeting held in Lausanne (Switzerland) before 300 delegates from 198 affiliated associations of ITF including Pakistan.

He was senior vice president of the Pakistan Tennis Federation (PTF) and a sports legend in the country.

Khawaja Saaed Hai died on 31 March 2021 at the age of 91.

References

External links
 Interview
Sindn Tennis Association profile

1930 births
2021 deaths
Pakistani male tennis players
20th-century Pakistani people